Pianist Art Tatum recorded commercially from 1932 until near his death. He recorded nearly 400 titles, if airchecks and informal, private recordings are included. He recorded for Brunswick (1933), Decca (1934–41), Capitol (1949, 1952) and for the labels associated with Norman Granz (1953–56).

Discography
 Piano Starts Here (Columbia, 1968; 1933 studio recordings & Gene Norman concert listed below)
 Classic Early Solos (1934-1937) (Decca-GRP, 1991)
 Solos (1940) (MCA, 1990)
 The Standard Sessions: 1935-1943 Transcriptions (Music & Arts, 1996) & The Standard Transcriptions (Piano Solos, 1935 - c. 1945) (Storyville, 1999)
 I Got Rhythm Vol.3 (1935-44) (Decca-GRP, 1993)
 Art Tatum Masterpieces (MCA, 1973; 2-LP set from 1930s Decca recordings)
 James P. Johnson (shared album) – Art Tatum Masterpieces Volume II And James P. Johnson Plays Fats Waller (MCA, 1977; from Decca recordings
 Standards (Black Lion, 1990; recorded 1938–1939 as per Standard Transcriptions above)
 Art Of Tatum 1941-1944 (MCA, 1974; with Big Joe Turner and trio)
 God Is in the House (Onyx, 1940–1941, released 1973; reissued by High Note, 1998)
 The V-Discs (Black Lion, 1944–1946; released 1978, CD 1988)
 Art Tatum Piano Impressions, (ARA, Boris Morros Music Company, c. 1945)
 Art Tatum Piano Solos (Asch, c.1945)
 Gene Norman Presents an Art Tatum Concert (Columbia, 1949; released 1952)
 Art Tatum (Capitol, 1950)
 Art Tatum Encores (Capitol, 1951)
 Footnotes to Jazz, Vol. 2: Jazz Rehearsal, II (Folkways, 1952)
 Art Tatum Trio (Capitol, 1953)
 Battle of Jazz, Volume 2 septet including Tatum and Big Joe Turner; shared album with Zutty Singleton (Brunswick, 1953)
 The Genius of Art Tatum (11-LPs Clef 1953-4; reissues as The Complete Pablo Solo Masterpieces, 7-CD set, Pablo, 1991 and The Art Tatum Solo Masterpieces, Vol. 1-8, Pablo, 1992)
 Makin' Whoopee (Verve, 1954)
 The Greatest Piano of Them All (Verve, 1954)
 Genius of Keyboard 1954–56 (Giants of Jazz)
 More of the Greatest Piano of Them All, (Verve, 1955)
 Still More of the Greatest Piano Hits of Them All (Verve, 1955)
 Tatum - Carter - Bellson (Clef, 1955; reissued as The Tatum Group Masterpieces, Volume One, Pablo, 1975)
 The Art Tatum-Roy Eldridge-Alvin Stoller-John Simmons Quartet (Clef, 1955; reissued as The Tatum Group Masterpieces, Vol. 2, Pablo, 1990)
 The Lionel Hampton Art Tatum Buddy Rich Trio (Clef, 1956; reissued as The Tatum Group Masterpieces, Volume Three, Pablo, 1975)
 The Tatum Group Masterpieces, Vol. 4: With Hampton, Rich, Again (Pablo, 1990)
 The Tatum Group Masterpieces, Vol. 5: Tatum-Hampton-Edison-Rich-Calendar-Kessel (Pablo 1975 & 1990, originally issued as Lionel Hampton And His Giants (Norgran, 1956) as by Hampton
 Presenting the Art Tatum Trio (Verve, 1956; released 1957; reissued as The Tatum Group Masterpieces, Volume Six, Pablo, 1975)
 The Art Tatum - Buddy DeFranco Quartet (Verve, 1956; released 1958; reissued as The Tatum Group Masterpieces, Volume Seven, Pablo, 1975)
 The Art Tatum - Ben Webster Quartet (Verve, 1956; released 1958; reissued as The Tatum Group Masterpieces, Volume Eight, Pablo, 1975 & )
 Capitol Jazz Classics – Volume 3 Solo Piano (1949 recordings; Capitol, 1972)
 The Complete Capitol Recordings, Vol. 1 (Capitol, 1989)
 The Complete Capitol Recordings, Vol. 2 (Capitol, 1989)
 The Complete Capitol Recordings (Blue Note, 1997; recorded 1949–1952)
 The Complete Pablo Group Masterpieces (Pablo, 1990; 6-CD box-set containing the eight individual releases listed above)

References

Discographies of American artists
Jazz discographies